Tech Coast Angels is the leading source of funding to early-stage companies in Southern California. TCA has over 450 members and is also one of the largest angel networks in the world. An analysis by CB Insights ranked TCA  No.1 out of 370 angel groups on “Network Centrality” and No. 5 overall in “Investor Mosaic.”

History 
Since its inception in 1997, TCA members have focused on building valuable companies, personally invested over $255 million in over 465 companies, and helped portfolio companies attract more than $2.2 billion in additional capital, largely from venture capital firms and strategic investors.  In 2020, TCA invested $20 million in 64 companies. 

TCA members provide companies capital, counsel,
mentoring and access to a network of potential investors and partners. TCA has chapters located in Los Angeles, Orange County, San Diego, and the Inland Empire.

Company exits 
TCA has had eleven IPOs and over 79 exits in total. Three of those (Mindbody, Greendot and Sandpiper Networks) achieved multiples between 149 and 265. TCA's successful exits include:
 Mindbody (wellness business services software)
 Green Dot Corporation (over-the-counter prepaid debit card)
Sandpiper Networks (internet infrastructure)
Companion Medical (smart insulin pen system paired with diabetes management app)
Leaselock (sells Certificates of Guarantee promising rent when tenant defaults)
BlueBeam Software (PDF collaboration software)
 Parcel Pending (electronic Smart Locker storage system for multi-family housing)
Truecar (automotive lead generation)
Green Earth Technologies (oil substitute made from waste beef tallow)
Casestack (Integrated Logistics Outsourcing)
One Stop Systems (manufactures Computers for Industrial Applications)
 Lytx (Drivecam (video event recorder for driver feedback safety)
 Cytom X Therapeutics (antibody therapeutics for a variety of serious diseases including cancer)
WiseWindow (open qualitative content aggregation platform)
 Vital Therapies (liver assist device)
Beam Global (portable solar EV charging station with no grid ties)
Language Weaver (machine translation software)
WeGoLook (dispatches in-person Lookers to verify claims made by internet sellers)
Portfolium (online social portfolio network)
 AIRSIS (remote asset tracking & management)
 Althea (cGMP manufacturing, analytical development, aseptic filling)
 N Spine (spine stability system)
 OptionEase (stock option audit financial software)
 Retrosense Therapeutics (biologic approach to vision restoration in retinal degenerative conditions)
 Greenplum (Intelligent Data Routing Systems)
Savara Pharmaceuticals (inhalable antibiotic for the treatment of MRSA in Cystic Fibrosis patients)
ClearCare (management of home care agencies)
eTeamz (B2C Amateur Athletic Community)
Olive Medical (HD surgical camera)
Pictage.com (online event photography services)
 Trius Therapeutics (antimicrobial drug)
 Molecular Medicine BioServices (contract clinical manufacturer)
 Allylix (artificial fragrance production)
In addition to the 79 exits, 103 companies in the portfolio were shutdowns with no returns. Based on all outcomes to date, TCA's portfolio has returned 4.8 times invested capital, and achieved an IRR of 22% on its portfolio.

Investment portfolio

The TCA investment portfolio page lists investments in general categories such as Life Sciences, Internet and Apps, Software, Consumer, CleanTech and Industrials, Hardware, Financial, and Business. Active portfolio companies include:

Apeel Sciences (tasteless edible coatings for fresh produce)
The Bouqs Company (Online Flower Shopping)
Buy It Installed (button integrated into retailer e-commerce site to include installation)
Cloudbeds (SAAS Hotel Hospitality Management Software)
Cognition Therapeutics (Memory Restoration for Alzheimer's)
ElephantDrive (storage-as-a-service software)
 Kickstart (Cadence Biomedical) (helps people with severe disabilities walk)
myLAB Box (testing for STDs from the comfort of home)
 Ninja Metrics (measures social influence)
 PharmaSecure (mass serialization codes for products in emerging markets)
 Procore Technologies (Construction Management SAAS)
 Ranker (UGC  social platform for ranking things)
Whistle (allows hotels to communicate with guests through Mobile Messaging and SMS)
 YouMail (voice messaging for cell phones)

References

Financial services companies established in 1997
Venture capital firms of the United States